The 2019–20 season was the Melbourne Victory's 15th season in the A-League. The club participated in the A-League, the FFA Cup, and the AFC Champions League.

On 24 March 2020, the FFA announced that the 2019–20 A-League season would be postponed until further notice due to the COVID-19 pandemic in Australia and New Zealand, and subsequently extended indefinitely. The season resumed on 17 July 2020. Similarly, the 2020 AFC Champions League competition has been suspended until at least mid-September 2020 in West Zone. The AFC Executive Committee agreed to played AFC Champions League East Zone matches which are now scheduled to be played between November 15 and December 13 2020 in Qatar.

Players

Transfers

Transfers in

From youth squad

Transfers out

Contract extensions

Technical staff

Squad statistics

Appearances and goals

{| class="wikitable sortable plainrowheaders" style="text-align:center"
|-
! rowspan="2" |
! rowspan="2" |
! rowspan="2" style="width:180px;" |Player
! colspan="2" style="width:87px;" |A-League
! colspan="2" style="width:87px;" |FFA Cup
! colspan="2" style="width:87px;" |AFC Champions League
! colspan="2" style="width:87px;" |Total
|-
!
!Goals
!
!Goals
!
!Goals
!
!Goals
|-
|1
|GK
! scope="row" | Matt Acton

|0
|0

|0+1
|0

|0
|0

!1
!0
|-
|2
|DF
! scope="row" | Storm Roux

|7+2
|0

|0
|0

|0
|0

!9
!0
|-
|3
|DF
! scope="row" | Corey Brown

|3+3
|0

|1
|0

|0
|0

!7
!0
|-
|4
|DF
! scope="row" | James Donachie

|11
|0

|0
|0

|0
|0

!11
!0
|-
|5
|DF
! scope="row" | Tim Hoogland

|1+1
|0

|0
|0

|0
|0

!2
!0
|-
|6
|MF
! scope="row" | Leigh Broxham

|11
|0

|1
|0

|0
|0

!12
!0
|-
|7
|FW
! scope="row" | Kenny Athiu

|1+5
|0

|1
|0

|0
|0

!7
!0
|-
|8
|MF
! scope="row" | Jakob Poulsen

|7+3
|0

|0
|0

|0
|0

!10
!0
|-
|9
|FW
! scope="row" | Andrew Nabbout

|7
|2

|1
|2

|0
|0

!8
!4
|-
|10
|FW
! scope="row" | Robbie Kruse

|4+2
|1

|0
|0

|0
|0

!6
!1
|-
|11
|FW
! scope="row" | Ola Toivonen

|11
|7

|0+1
|0

|0
|0

!12
!7
|-
|13
|MF
! scope="row" | Birkan Kirdar

|0
|0

|0
|0

|0
|0

!0
!0
|-
|14
|DF
! scope="row" | Thomas Deng

|6
|0

|1
|0

|0
|0

!7
!0
|-
|16
|MF
! scope="row" | Josh Hope

|1+2
|0

|1
|0

|0
|0

!4
!0
|-
|17
|DF
! scope="row" | Elvis Kamsoba

|8+2
|0

|1
|0

|0
|0

!11
!0
|-
|18
|MF
! scope="row" | Migjen Basha

|9+2
|0

|0
|0

|0
|0

!11
!0
|-
|19
|DF
! scope="row" | Benjamin Carrigan

|0+2
|0

|0
|0

|0
|0

!2
!0
|-
|20
|GK
! scope="row" | Lawrence Thomas

|10
|0

|1
|0

|0
|0

!11
!0
|-
|21
|DF
! scope="row" | Adama Traoré

|11
|0

|0
|0

|0
|0

!11
!0
|-
|22
|MF
! scope="row" | Kristijan Dobras

|5+2
|1

|0
|0

|0
|0

!7
!1
|-
|24
|MF
! scope="row" | Anthony Lesiotis

|4+2
|0

|1
|0

|0
|0

!7
!0
|-
|25
|MF
! scope="row" | Brandon Lauton

|3
|0

|0
|0

|0
|0

!3
!0
|-
|26
|MF
! scope="row" | Jay Barnett

|0+1
|0

|0
|0

|0
|0

!1
!0
|-
|28
|DF
! scope="row" | Benjamin Carrigan

|0
|0

|1
|0

|0
|0

!1
!0
|-
|29
|MF
! scope="row" | Brandon Lauton

|0
|0

|1
|0

|0
|0

!1
!0
|-
|30
|GK
! scope="row" | Matthew Sutton

|0
|0

|0
|0

|0
|0

!0
!0
|-
|32
|FW
! scope="row" | Jack Palazzolo

|0
|0

|0+1
|0

|0
|0

!1
!0
|-
|33
|DF
! scope="row" | Aaron Anderson

|0
|0

|0
|0

|0
|0

!0
!0
|-
|34
|DF
! scope="row" | Matthew Bozinovski

|0
|0

|0
|0

|0
|0

!0
!0
|-
|50
|GK
! scope="row" | Brendan White

|0
|0

|0
|0

|0
|0

!0
!0
|}

Disciplinary record

Pre-season and friendlies

Competitions

Overview
{|class="wikitable" style="text-align:left"
|-
!rowspan=2 style="width:140px;"|Competition
!colspan=8|Record
|-
!style="width:30px;"|
!style="width:30px;"|
!style="width:30px;"|
!style="width:30px;"|
!style="width:30px;"|
!style="width:30px;"|
!style="width:30px;"|
!style="width:50px;"|
|-
|A-League

|-
|FFA Cup

|-
|AFC Champions League

|-
!Total

FFA Cup

A-League

League table

Results summary

Result by round

Matches

AFC Champions League

Qualifying play-offs

Group stage

Knockout stage

References

Melbourne Victory FC seasons
2019–20 A-League season by team